Owaneco is a village in Christian County, Illinois, United States. The population was 209 at the 2020 census.

Geography
Owaneco is located at  (39.482193, -89.193597).

Demographics

As of the 2020 census there were 209 people, 87 households, and 65 families residing in the village. The racial makeup of the village was 96.65% White, 0.96% African American, and 2.39% from two or more races. No residents reported an ethnicity of Hispanic or Latino.

There were 87 households, out of which 49.43% had children under the age of 18 living with them, 60.92% were married couples living together, 10.34% had a female householder with no husband present, and 25.29% were non-families. 18.39% of all households were made up of individuals, and 5.75% had someone living alone who was 65 years of age or older. The average household size was 3.31 and the average family size was 2.98.

The village's age distribution consisted of 17.0% under the age of 18, 15.1% from 18 to 24, 30.9% from 25 to 44, 22.4% from 45 to 64, and 14.7% who were 65 years of age or older. The median age was 36.3 years. For every 100 females, there were 83.7 males. For every 100 females age 18 and over, there were 97.2 males.

The median income for a household in the village was $64,063, and the median income for a family was $68,125. Males had a median income of $41,731 versus $24,792 for females. The per capita income for the village was $25,636. No of families and 8.5% of the population were below the poverty line, including none of those under age 18 and 5.3% of those age 65 or over.

Owaneco in popular culture
In the That '70s Show two-part episode titled "What Is and What Should Never Be", character Steven Hyde (portrayed by Danny Masterson) wears a T-shirt advertising Owaneco Motorcycle Service, an actual motorcycle repair shop on Illinois Route 29 on the south edge of Owaneco.

References

Villages in Christian County, Illinois
Villages in Illinois